The Tonapah Extension Mining Company Power Building is a historic power plant located on Main Street in Tonopah, Nevada. The building was constructed by 1920 by the Tonopah Extension Mining Company, possibly as a replacement for a 1909 plant. The plant was built with fired brick, an unusual construction material in the area. It is the only surviving building from the Tonopah Extension Mine, a major Tonopah mine which opened in 1903.

The building was added to the National Register of Historic Places on May 20, 1982.

References

Tonopah, Nevada
Power Building
Industrial buildings completed in 1920
Industrial buildings and structures on the National Register of Historic Places in Nevada
National Register of Historic Places in Tonopah, Nevada
Energy infrastructure on the National Register of Historic Places
1920 establishments in Nevada